Elvis Amoh (born February 2, 1992) is a Ghanaian footballer who currently plays for Hartford Athletic in the USL Championship.

Career
In June 2016 he moved from First Capital Plus FC  to Asante Kotoko and in June 2017 to West African Football Academy on loan, in May 2018 joined back to Asante Kotoko.

He joined Capital City F.C. in 2017. On 5 February 2018 was invited by Bethlehem Steel FC
for trials and featured  in a friendly with FC Motown at YSC Sports on February 10, 2018. Amoh was later signed by SK Líšeň.

Amoh signed with Loudoun United FC for the remainder of the 2019 USL season. On January 22, 2020, Amoh re-signed with Loudoun for the 2020 USL season.

On 19 March 2021, Amoh joined USL Championship side Rio Grande Valley FC. Amoh led RGV in scoring during their 2021 season.

Amoh signed with Colorado Springs Switchbacks FC on 21 December 2021. On 5 January 2023, Amoh was transferred to Hartford Athletic for an undisclosed transfer fee.

References

1992 births
Living people
Ghanaian footballers
Asante Kotoko S.C. players
Association football forwards
Loudoun United FC players
USL Championship players
Ghanaian expatriate footballers
Ghanaian expatriate sportspeople in the United States
Expatriate soccer players in the United States
Ghanaian expatriate sportspeople in Canada
Expatriate soccer players in Canada
Footballers from Accra
Canadian Soccer League (1998–present) players
Rio Grande Valley FC Toros players
Expatriate footballers in the Czech Republic
Ghanaian expatriate sportspeople in the Czech Republic
SK Líšeň players
West African Football Academy players
Colorado Springs Switchbacks FC players
Hartford Athletic players